Jia Ali is a Pakistani actress and model. She is known for her roles in dramas Band Khirkyon Kay Peechay, Hum Tehray Gunahgaar, Pukaar and Meer Abru.

Early life
Jia was born in 1972 on 8th September in Lahore, Punjab, Pakistan. She completed her studies from St Mary High School.

Career
Jia started acting on PTV. After that she appeared in PTV dramas Imtehaan, Parchain, Kaghaz Kay Phool, Kabhi Kabhi Pyar Mein and Tanha. She also appeared in two seasons of drama Band Khirkyon Kay Peechay, Meer Abru, Hum Tehray Gunahgaar and Pukaar. She also appeared in movies Deewane Tere Pyar Ke, Ghar Kab Aao Gay, Love Mein Ghum and Saya e Khuda e Zuljalal.

Personal life
She married Hongkong based cricket coach and businessman Imran Idrees in May 2021.

Filmography

Television

Web series

Telefilm

Film

Awards and nominations

References

External links
 
 
 

1972 births
Living people
Punjabi people
20th-century Pakistani actresses
Actresses in Punjabi cinema
21st-century Pakistani actresses
Pakistani television actresses
Pakistani film actresses
Models from Punjab, Pakistan
Female models from Punjab, Pakistan
Actresses in Urdu cinema